Brickellia greenei is a species of flowering plant in the family Asteraceae known by the common name Greene's brickellbush. It is native to the mountain ranges of southwestern Oregon and northern California, including the Cascades, the northern Coast Ranges, and Sierra Nevada (mostly as north of Alpine County but with a few isolated populations in Inyo and Mariposa Counties).

The inflorescences hold widely spaced flower heads, each about long and lined with narrow, pointed phyllaries. Each flower head holds a nearly spherical array of about 60 thready disc florets.

The species is named for American botanist Edward Lee Greene, 1843–1915.

References

External links
Jepson Manual Treatment: Brickellia greenei
United States Department of Agriculture Plants Profile
Brickellia greenei - Calphotos Photo gallery, University of California

greenei
Flora of California
Flora of Oregon
Plants described in 1877
Flora without expected TNC conservation status